Donald Eugene Blair-Sanford (born February 5, 1987) is an American-Israeli Olympic sprinter, who specialises in the 400 metre dash.

His personal record at 400 metres is 45.04 seconds.  He represented Israel in the 2012 Summer Olympics. He won the bronze medal in 400 metres at the 2014 European Athletics Championships, with a new Israeli record of 45.27 seconds. Competing for Israel at the 2015 European Games, Sanford won with a time of 45.75.

Early life
Sanford was born, one of four children, in Inglewood in Los Angeles County, California, to Donald E. Sanford Jr. and Debra Blair, who had run track in high school. He attended City Honors High School in Inglewood but competed for Morningside High School. He won the 400m dash at the California Interscholastic Federation Division III Championships, and was a member of the National Honor Society.

He competed for one season at Morgan State University, running a season-best time of 46.92 to place second at the IC4A Championships.

He became an Israeli citizen after marrying Israeli basketball player Danielle Dekel, whom he met when they were both students at Central Arizona College where she was playing basketball for the school. He earned an associate degree at Central Arizona in 2007, where he ran on two NJCAA Outdoor Championship teams (in 2006 and 2007).

He also studied at Arizona State University, which he represented in athletic competitions within the United States, and set his 400m personal record of 45.21 seconds. He was the 2010 NCAA runner-up at 400 meters and was part of the 4×400-meter indoor and outdoor relays that season, and was named an All-American.

Achievements
Sanford's club is Maccabi Tel Aviv, and he is coached by Lloyd Cowan.

In 2012, Sanford represented Israel for the first time at a major sporting event, finishing 4th at the European Athletic Championships, held in Helsinki, nine-hundredths of a second away from a medal at 45.91 seconds.

A little over a month later, he ran in the 2012 Summer Olympics.  His shoes were stolen from his bag just ahead of his qualifying heat, and he had to run in a teammate's shoes. He finished fifth in a time of 45.71 seconds, in a race won by double-amputee South African Oscar Pistorius, and did not make it out of the qualifying rounds.  He was ranked 26th, two places and one-tenth of a second behind the runners who qualified for the semifinals.

At the 2013 Maccabiah Games, Sanford broke the Israeli record and won the gold medal in the 400 meter race with a time of 45.65, defeating Australian Olympic finalist Steven Solomon.

In 2014, Sanford won the bronze medal in the 400 metres sprint at the European Athletic Championships held in Zurich on August 15, 2014, with a new Israeli record of 45.27 seconds. He dedicated his medal to the Israel Defense Forces. He was the second Israeli to win a medal at the European Athletic Championships, after Alex Averbukh won gold medals in the pole vault in 2002 and 2006.

In December 2014, he was named Israeli Sportsman of the Year.

In June 2015, competing for Israel at the 2015 European Games, Sanford won the 400 m in 45.75, a European Games record, as Team Israel won a bronze medal.

Sanford competed for Israel at the 2016 Summer Olympics.  He ran the 400m and finished in 5th place in his heat in a time of 46.06, 10 split-seconds behind the semi-final qualifying time, and placed 33rd overall.

Personal life
Sanford and his wife, Israeli native Danielle Dekel-Sanford, married in 2008, and live in Kibbutz Ein Shemer about an hour north of Tel Aviv with their children, Amerie Ann and Rylee. His wife's father, Ehud Dekel, was the first Israeli to compete in four different sports in Israel’s highest sports league, the First League. His older sister, Donnisha "CoCoa" Sanford was a member of the 2004 Pac-10 regular-season championship team for the University of Arizona women's basketball team. She also played professional basketball overseas from 2009-2012.

Personal bests

See also
List of Israeli records in athletics
List of Maccabiah records in athletics

References

External links
 
 Donald Sanford at Athletic.net
 

1987 births
Living people
Olympic athletes of Israel
Athletes (track and field) at the 2012 Summer Olympics
Athletes (track and field) at the 2016 Summer Olympics
Track and field athletes from Los Angeles
American emigrants to Israel
African-American male track and field athletes
Central Arizona College alumni
Morgan State University alumni
Arizona State Sun Devils men's track and field athletes
American male sprinters
Israeli male sprinters
European Athletics Championships medalists
European Games bronze medalists for Israel
Athletes (track and field) at the 2015 European Games
European Games medalists in athletics
Israeli people of African-American descent
Maccabiah Games medalists in athletics
Maccabiah Games gold medalists for Israel
Competitors at the 2013 Maccabiah Games
21st-century African-American sportspeople
20th-century African-American people